Events from the year 1863 in China.

Incumbents 
 Tongzhi Emperor (3rd year)
 Regent: Empress Dowager Cixi
 Regent: Prince Gong

Events 

 Taiping Rebellion
 Taiping Commander Shi Dakai surrenders to the Qing 
 Battle of Suzhou (1863)
 Nian Rebellion
 Miao Rebellion (1854–73)
 Dungan Revolt (1862–77)
 Panthay Rebellion
 Tongzhi Restoration

Deaths 
 Tan Shaoguang, betrayed and killed in Suzhou
 Shi Dakai, executed in Chengdu